CIUX-FM (105.5 MHz) is a commercial FM radio station in Uxbridge, Ontario, Canada serving the eastern suburbs of the Greater Toronto area. Owned by Torres Radio, it broadcasts an adult contemporary format branded as 105.5 Hits FM.

CIUX-FM has an effective radiated power (ERP) of 372 watts, with a maximum of 900 watts.

History

On April 3, 2012, Frank Torres received approval from the Canadian Radio-television and Telecommunications Commission (CRTC) to operate a news station on 105.5 MHz. The applicant indicated that the proposed station would be a first radio service for the community of Uxbridge.

The station's launch was delayed into 2015 by several disputes, including Bell Canada briefly opposing the station's co-location on one of its towers, and conflicts with another station owner who objected to the new station.  

The station launched on September 21, 2015 as 105.5 Hits FM.  The call sign's last two letters represent UXbridge, its city of license. Veteran broadcaster and Uxbridge native Dan Pollard was hired as an on-air personality, hosting the morning and noon-hour programs.

References

External links

 

Iux
Iux
Radio stations established in 2012
2015 establishments in Ontario